Distelhausen is a district of Tauberbischofsheim with 882 residents.

Geography
Distelhausenis located south-east of Tauberbischofsheim in the Tauberfranken region of Franconia.

History
Distelhausen is one of seven districts of Tauberbischofsheim. The other districts are the town of Tauberbischofsheim, as well as Dienstadt, Dittigheim, Dittwar, Hochhausen and Impfingen.

Distelhausen was incorporated to Tauberbischofsheim during the local government reform in Baden-Württemberg on January 1, 1975.

References

External links

Villages in Baden-Württemberg
Main-Tauber-Kreis